Oona Garthwaite is an American singer-songwriter. She was born in California to a musical family, niece of Terry Garthwaite and daughter of David Garthwaite, founding members of the Joy of Cooking (band). Oona's co-writing project with Oakland-based producer Dave Tweedie is listed under the bandname "OONA". Their music has been featured several times on the reality TV show So You Think You Can Dance, including an audition by Stephen "Twitch" Boss and a routine choreographed by Sonya Tayeh and performed by Ellenore Scott and Jakob Karr. A collaboration with the band Jet Stream (Dave Tweedie, Stephen Bradley and Bijou), a song called "Remote Control", was aired on the Season Premiere of The CW's 2010 show, Life Unexpected. Oona offers the song as a free download for fans through her website.

In August 2009 OONA was interviewed by MTV2.

References

External links
Official website

American women singer-songwriters
Living people
Place of birth missing (living people)
Year of birth missing (living people)
Singer-songwriters from California
21st-century American women